In the Babylonian epic Enuma Elish, Kishar is the daughter of Lahamu and Lahmu, the first children of Tiamat and Abzu. She is the female principle, sister and wife of Anshar, the male principle, and the mother of Anu. Kishar may represent the earth as a counterpart to Anshar, the sky, and can be seen as an earth mother goddess. Her name also means "Whole Earth". 

Kishar appears only once in Enuma Elish, in the opening lines of the epic, and then disappears from the remainder of the story.  She appears only occasionally in other first millennium BCE texts, where she can be equated with the goddess Antu.

References

External links
Ancient Mesopotamian Gods and Goddesses: Anšar and Kišar (god and goddess)

Mesopotamian goddesses
Earth goddesses
Nature goddesses
Characters in the Enūma Eliš
Mother goddesses